Malota is a surname. Notable people with the surname include:

Pjetër Malota (born 1959), Albanian actor
Renato Malota (born 1989), Albanian footballer

See also
Mallota, Greece, a village in Arcadia, Greece